The Saginaw News is a newspaper publication based in Saginaw, Michigan, owned by Booth Newspapers, a division of Advance Publications. Published on Thursdays, Fridays and Sundays (along with a joint Tuesday edition with The Bay City Times), the paper has approximately 30,000 readers each day. It celebrated its 150th year in 2009.

The Saginaw News is the sister publication of the neighboring Bay City Times and Flint Journal, all owned by Booth Newspapers.

The paper was originally published seven days a week until June 1, 2009, when the News and its sister papers, The Bay City Times and The Flint Journal, reduced publishing to three times a week—Thursday, Friday and Sunday, while increasing their web presence. In addition, The Saginaw News began to be published at the Booth-owned Valley Publishing Co. printing plant in Monitor Township, near Bay City.

On March 30, 2010, The Saginaw News and The Bay City Times launched a joint Tuesday print edition, Great Lakes Bay Edition, which is available at selected locations in Saginaw, Bay and Midland Counties.

Staff 
The Saginaw News is headed up by President Dan Gaydou; its editorial staff is led by Executive Editor Paul Keep, who also is executive editor of MLive.com's sister newspapers across Michigan. Local coverage for The Saginaw News is directed by Editor Jodi McFarland; managing producer Eric English. Reporters and their coverage beats are Mark Tower, City Hall; Brad Devereaux, police; Bob Johnson; police and schools; Andy Hoag, courts; Heather Jordan, business; Jessica Shepherd, entertainment; Hugh Bernreuter and Cory Butzin, sports; Jeff Schrier, photographer.

See also
Saginaw Daily Courier

References

External links
 The Saginaw News at mlive.com

Newspapers published in Michigan
Saginaw, Michigan
Advance Publications
Newspapers established in 1859
1859 establishments in Michigan